Lister Glacier is a glacier on the east side of the Royal Society Range in Antarctica, draining northeast from a large cirque immediately north of Mount Lister. It derives its name from Mount Lister, and was surveyed in 1957 by the New Zealand Blue Glacier Party of the Commonwealth Trans-Antarctic Expedition, 1956–58.

External links 
 Lister Glacier on USGS website
 Lister Glacier on the Antarctica New Zealand Digital Asset Manager website
 Lister Glacier on AADC website
 Lister Glacier on SCAR website

References 

Glaciers of Victoria Land
Scott Coast